Little Longstone is a civil parish in the Derbyshire Dales district of Derbyshire, England.  The parish contains nine listed buildings that are recorded in the National Heritage List for England.  All the listed buildings are designated at Grade II, the lowest of the three grades, which is applied to "buildings of national importance and special interest".  The parish contains the village of Little Longstone and the surrounding countryside.  The listed buildings consist of houses and cottages, a public house, a set of village stocks, a barn, a chapel, a former stable range, and a railway viaduct.


Buildings

References

Citations

Sources

 

Lists of listed buildings in Derbyshire